"Wonder" is a song by Canadian singer Shawn Mendes from his fourth studio album of the same name. The song, which serves as the album's lead single, was released on October 2, 2020, by Island Records. The track was written and produced by Mendes, Scott Harris, Nate Mercereau and Kid Harpoon. The single reached the top-ten in Canada, Hungary, and Singapore, as well as the top-twenty in twelve countries including Australia, the United Kingdom, and the United States.

Release and promotion
The song and the album were first teased on September 30, 2020, on Mendes' Twitter account, where he tweeted "WHAT IS #WONDER". He followed the tweet up with a link to an interactive website, where, on a piece of paper on the floor in the interactive room, was a setlist with the word Wonder. Later on, he posted a handwritten note onto social media and confirmed that the single, as well as an accompanying music video would be released on October 2.

Live performances
On October 26, 2020, Mendes announced The Wonder Residency, a series of performances from different theaters & venues performing songs from the album. On October 27, 2020, Mendes performed the song as part of a medley on The Tonight Show Starring Jimmy Fallon for the first time. On October 29, Mendes performed an acoustic version of the song on Global Citizen: EveryVoteCounts/2020. On November 10, Mendes performed the song on BBC Radio 1's Live Lounge. On November 13, he performed the track as part of BBC's Children In Need show. On November 22, Mendes performed the song at the American Music Awards of 2020. On December 6, Mendes performed the song on "Live From Wonder: The Experience".

Composition
The song has been described as a power ballad. Lyrically, the song sees Mendes contemplating "imagined scenarios", as well as "stepping foot into his friend's shoes". The singer also comments on toxic masculinity, singing "I wonder, when I cry into my hands, I'm conditioned to feel like it makes me less of a man". "Wonder" finds Mendes "broadening his sonic horizons — experimenting with a widescreen, full-bodied sound".

Accolades

Music video
The music video premiered on Mendes' Vevo channel on October 2, 2020, at midnight Eastern Time. The video was directed by Matty Peacock.

Synopsis
The music video starts with a scene that shows Mendes sitting on a train by himself, looking outside the window. He then stands from his seat and makes his way to the top of the train. The train ride was compared to the scenes on the Hogwarts Express during the Harry Potter series. The next scene immediately cuts to Mendes in a forest, where he begins to run towards the edge of the forest, where there is a cliff. As he sings, it begins to rain and Mendes is seen singing at the top of his lungs. The video closes out with Mendes kneeling on top of the cliff whilst the rain stops.

Lyric video
A lyric video was also released to Mendes' Vevo channel on October 5, 2020.

Commercial performance 
"Wonder" debuted and peaked at number 18 on the Billboard Hot 100 on October 12, 2020. It debuted at number 4 on the Canadian Hot 100. The song also charted in various European countries.

Credits and personnel
Credits adapted from Tidal.

 Shawn Mendes – vocals, songwriting, production, composition, piano, synthesizer
 Scott Harris – songwriting, production, composition
 Nate Mercereau – songwriting, additional production, composition, guitar, horn, drums
 Kid Harpoon – songwriting, production, composition, guitar, drums, programming, synthesizer
 Michael Lehmann Boddicker – engineering
 Edie Lehmann Boddicker – additional vocals, choir arrangement
 George Seara – vocal engineering
 Jeremy Hatcher – vocal engineering
 Mike Stent – mixing
 Kaushlesh "Garry" Purohit – vocal engineering
 Clydene Jackson – additional vocals
 Jarrett Johnson – additional vocals
 Nayanna Holley – additional vocals
 Toni Scruggs – additional vocals

Charts

Weekly charts

Year-end charts

Certifications

Release history

References

External links
 

2020s ballads
2020 songs
2020 singles
Electronica songs
Island Records singles
Pop ballads
Rock ballads
Shawn Mendes songs
Songs written by Kid Harpoon
Songs written by Scott Harris (songwriter)
Songs written by Shawn Mendes